Marvel Entertainment, LLC (formerly Marvel Enterprises) is an American entertainment company founded in June 1998 and based in New York City, New York, formed by the merger of Marvel Entertainment Group and Toy Biz. The company is a wholly owned subsidiary of The Walt Disney Company since 2009, and is mainly known for its comic books by Marvel Comics, as well as its forays into films and television/streaming shows, including those within the Marvel Cinematic Universe (MCU).

For financial reporting purposes, Marvel is primarily reported as part of Disney's Consumer Products segment ever since Marvel Studios' reorganization from Marvel Entertainment into Walt Disney Studios.

Over the years, Marvel Entertainment has entered into several partnerships and negotiations with other companies across a variety of businesses. , Marvel has film licensing agreements with Sony Pictures via Columbia Pictures (for Spider-Man films) and Universal Pictures (a right of first refusal to pick up the distribution rights to any future Hulk films produced by Marvel Studios), and theme park licensing agreements with IMG Worlds of Adventure and Universal Destinations & Experiences (for specific Marvel character rights at Islands of Adventure and Universal Studios Japan). Aside from their contract with Universal Parks & Resorts, Marvel's characters and properties have also appeared at Disney Parks.

History

Marvel Entertainment Group 

That year, it was sold to New World Entertainment Ltd as part of the liquidation of Cadence Industries. On January 6, 1989, Ronald Perelman's MacAndrews & Forbes Holdings bought Marvel Entertainment Group from New World for $82.5 million. The deal did not include Marvel Productions, which was folded into New World's TV and movie business.

"It is a mini-Disney in terms of intellectual property," said Perelman. "Disney's got much more highly recognized characters and softer characters, whereas our characters are termed action heroes. But at Marvel we are now in the business of the creation and marketing of characters."

Public offering and acquisition
Marvel made an initial public offering of 40% of the stock (ticker symbol NYSE:MRV) on July 15, 1991, giving $40 million from the proceeds to Andrews Group, Marvel's then direct parent corporation within MacAndrews & Forbes Holdings.

In the early 1990s, Marvel Entertainment Group began expanding though acquisitions and the formation of new divisions. Marvel purchased the trading card company Fleer on July 24, 1992. On April 30, 1993, Marvel acquired 46% of ToyBiz, which gave the company the rights to make Marvel toys. The Andrews Group named Avi Arad of ToyBiz as the president and CEO of the Marvel Films division.

In 1993 and 1994, Marvel's holding companies, Marvel Holdings, Inc. and Marvel Parent Holdings, Inc., were formed between Andrews Group and MEG. The companies issued over half a billion dollars in bonds under the direction of Perelman, which was passed up in dividends to Perelman's group of companies. On July 5, 1994, Marvel acquired Panini Group, an Italian sticker-maker, followed by Malibu Comics on November 3  and Heroes World Distribution, a regional distributor to comic-book shops, in December. On March 10, 1995, it acquired trading card company SkyBox International and was completed later in May.

Marvel's attempt to distribute its products directly led to a decrease in sales and aggravated the losses which Marvel suffered when the comic book bubble popped, the 1994 Major League Baseball strike massacred the profits of the Fleer unit, and Panini, whose revenue depended largely on Disney licensing, was hobbled by poor Disney showings at the box office. A minority of dissidents maintain no bubble existed.

Bankruptcy and Marvel Studios 
In late 1995, Marvel reported its first annual loss under Perelman, which was attributed mainly to the company's large size and a shrinking market. On January 4, 1996 Marvel laid off 275 employees.

In late 1996, Perelman proposed a plan to save Marvel in which the company would merge with Toy Biz after Perelman spent $350 million for the Toy Biz shares that he didn't already own. He would then receive newly issued Marvel shares to maintain his 80 percent stake.

Separately, in July 1996, Marvel filed with the U.S. Securities and Exchange Commission to raise money to create a private entity called Marvel Studios. Much of the money to create Marvel Studios came from the sale of Toy Biz stock.

On December 27, 1996, the Marvel group of companies filed for Chapter 11 bankruptcy protection. At this time, Carl Icahn, an American businessman and investor, began buying Marvel's bonds at 20% of their value and moved to block Perelman's plan. In February 1997, Icahn won the bankruptcy court's approval to take control of the company's stock. Later, in June 1997, Icahn won the right to replace Marvel's board, including Perelman.

In December 1997, during the post-bankruptcy reorganization phase, Toy Biz came to an agreement to purchase Marvel from the banks. In December 1997, the bankruptcy court appointed a trustee to oversee the company in place of Icahn. In April 1998, while the legal battle continued, the NYSE delisted Marvel stock.

In August 2008, former company head Ronald Perelman paid $80 million to settle a lawsuit accusing him of helping divert $553.5 million in notes when he controlled the company.

Marvel Enterprises
ToyBiz and Marvel Entertainment Group were merged into Marvel Enterprises to bring it out of bankruptcy on June 2, 1998. In February 1999, Fleer/Skybox was sold to a corporation owned by Alex and Roger Grass, a father and son, for US$30 million.

Later, the rights to names like "Spider-Man" were being challenged. Toy Biz hired an attorney to review its license agreement. Los Angeles patent attorney Carole E. Handler found a legal loophole in the licensing of the Marvel name and was successful in reclaiming Marvel Enterprises' movie rights to its character Spider-Man.

Marvel Enterprise organized itself into four major units, Marvel Studios, Toy Biz, Licensing and Publishing, while in November 1999 adding Marvel Characters Group to manage Marvel's IP and oversee marketing. Marvel named its Marvel New Media president, Steve Milo, in November 2000 to oversee its website.

In 2003, Bill Stine purchased back Quest Aerospace, a 1995 Toy Biz acquisition, from Marvel. In summer 2003, Marvel placed an offer for Artisan Entertainment. A new unit, Marvel International, was set up in London under a president, Bruno Maglione, to extend the company's operation and presence in major overseas markets in November 2003. In December 2003, Marvel Entertainment acquired Cover Concepts from Hearst Communications, Inc. In November 2004, Marvel consolidated its children's sleepwear-apparel licensing business with American Marketing Enterprises, Inc.

In November 2004, the corporation sued South Korea-based NCSoft Corp. and San Jose, California-based Cryptic Studios Inc. over possible trademark infringement in their City of Heroes massive multiplayer online game. Marvel settled a film-royalties lawsuit in April 2005 with its former editor-in-chief, publisher and creator, Stan Lee, paying him $10 million and negotiating an end to his royalties.

Marvel Entertainment
In September 2005, Marvel Enterprises changed its name to Marvel Entertainment to reflect the corporation's expansion into financing its own movie slate.

In 2007, several Stan Lee Media related groups filed lawsuits against Marvel Entertainment for $1 billion and for Lee's Marvel creations in multiple states, most of which have been dismissed. Additionally, a lawsuit over ownership of the character Ghost Rider was filed on March 30, 2007, by Gary Friedrich and Gary Friedrich Enterprises, Inc.

Disney subsidiary (2009–present)
On August 31, 2009, The Walt Disney Company announced a deal to acquire Marvel Entertainment for $4 billion, with Marvel shareholders to receive $30 and approximately 0.745 Disney shares for each share of Marvel they own. The voting occurred on December 31, 2009 and the merger was approved. The acquisition of Marvel was finalized hours after the shareholder vote, therefore giving Disney full ownership of Marvel Entertainment. The company was delisted from the New York Stock Exchange under its ticker symbol (MVL), due to the closing of the deal.

On June 2, 2010 Marvel announced that it promoted Joe Quesada to Chief Creative Officer of Marvel Entertainment. In June 2010, Marvel set up a television division headed by Jeph Loeb as executive vice president. Three months later, Smith & Tinker licensed from Marvel the character rights for a superhero digital collectible game for Facebook and Apple's mobile platform. On October 1, 2010, Marvel moved its offices to a  suite at 135 W. 50th Street, New York City, New York, under a nine-year sublease contract.

Stan Lee Media's lawsuit against Marvel was dismissed again in February 2011.

In March 2013, Feld Entertainment agreed with Marvel to produce a Marvel Character-based live arena show. Marvel was also launching a new pop culture and lifestyle web show, “Earth’s Mightiest Show”. On August 22, 2013, Marvel Entertainment announced that it was working with Hero Ventures on The Marvel Experience, a traveling production/attraction. In April 2014, Hong Kong Disneyland announced the construction of Iron Man Experience, the first Marvel ride at any Disney theme park. It opened in 2017 and was built on a location in the park's Tomorrowland.

On September 16, 2009, the Jack Kirby estate served notices of termination to Walt Disney Studios, 20th Century Fox, Universal Pictures, Paramount Pictures, and Sony Pictures to attempt to gain control of various Silver Age Marvel characters. Marvel sought to invalidate those claims. In mid-March 2010 Kirby's estate "sued Marvel to terminate copyrights and gain profits from [Kirby's] comic creations." In July 2011, the United States District Court for the Southern District of New York issued a summary judgment in favor of Marvel, which was affirmed in August 2013 by the United States Court of Appeals for the Second Circuit. The Kirby estate filed a petition on March 21, 2014 for a review of the case by the Supreme Court of the United States, but a settlement was reached on September 26, 2014 and the family requested that the petition be dismissed.

Marvel president of TV, publishing and brand Dan Buckley was promoted to Marvel Entertainment president in January 2017 adding games, global brand management and the franchise groups to his current responsibilities. In October 2017, Ron Richards began working at Marvel Entertainment as vice president and Managing Editor of New Media. Marvel New Media expanded into a new field with the development of a scripted podcast series, Wolverine: The Long Night, announced on December 5, 2017. Marvel and SiriusXM announced on October 22, 2019 a multi-year deal for scripted and unscripted podcast series and themed live events.

Marvel Entertainment announced a new pre-school franchise, Marvel Super Hero Adventures, in September 2017 consisting of a short-form animated series along with publishing and merchandise during "Marvel Mania" October. On December 7, 2017, Marvel announced its Marvel Rising franchise focusing on new characters as youngsters starting with animation in 2018. Marvel Comics is expected to publish material for Marvel Rising, but delayed any announcement on their material.

In May 2018, The Walt Disney Company Australia purchased eight year naming rights to Docklands Stadium from Melbourne Stadiums Limited and selected the Marvel brand as part of the name. Since September 1, 2018, the stadium has been known commercially as Marvel Stadium. A Marvel retail store and other inclusion of Marvel would be added to the stadium.

In October 2019, Marvel Studios head Kevin Feige was named Marvel's Chief Creative Officer, overseeing all the creative affairs within Marvel Entertainment in addition to Marvel Studios. Under the structure, Marvel Television and Marvel Family Entertainment (animation) moved to Marvel Studios, with Marvel Entertainment president Dan Buckley reporting to Feige. With the December 2019 announcement of folding of Marvel TV into Marvel Studios came the dismissal of executives of vice president level and above in TV and animation under Feige plus the removal of Brian Crosby as creative director of Themed Entertainment for Marvel Entertainment.

Units

Current 
 Marvel Custom Solutions, customized comic books
 Marvel Brands, LLC
 Marvel Games, the division utilized for video game promotion and licensing of Marvel intellectual properties to video game publishers.
 Cover Concepts, Inc.
 Marvel Worldwide, Inc., publisher of Marvel Comics
 Marvel Comics
 Marvel Press
 Marvel Knights
 Icon Comics
 Infinite Comics
 Timely Comics
 MAX

Intellectual property holding companies

 Iron Works Productions LLC, movie rights subsidiary
 Incredible Productions LLC (Delaware), movie rights subsidiary
 Marvel Characters, Inc.: subsidiary holding general rights of all Marvel Comics characters
 MVL Rights, LLC: subsidiary holding Marvel Comics characters' movie rights
 MVL Film Finance LLC: holder of Marvel's Movie debt and theatrical film rights to the ten characters as collateral.
 Marvel Characters B.V. (The Netherlands)
 Marvel International Character Holdings LLC (Delaware)
 Marvel Property, Inc. (Delaware) incorporated February 12, 1986 (formerly Marvel Entertainment Group, Inc.)
 Marvel Entertainment International Limited (United Kingdom)
 Marvel Property, Inc. (Delaware)
 Marvel Internet Productions LLC (Delaware)
 Marvel Toys Limited (Hong Kong)
 MRV, Inc. (Delaware)
 MVL Development LLC (Delaware)
 Marvel Film Productions LLC (Delaware)
 Iron Works Productions LLC: subsidiary holding debt to finance the Iron Man movie.
 MVL Productions LLC: an indirect wholly owned a film development subsidiary
 Incredible Productions LLC (Delaware): subsidiary holding debt to finance the Incredible Hulk film
 MVL Iron Works Productions Canada, Inc. (Province of Ontario)
 MVL Incredible Productions Canada, Inc. (Province of Ontario)
 Asgard Productions LLC (Delaware)
 Green Guy Toons LLC (Delaware)
 Squad Productions LLC (Delaware)

Marvel New Media 

Marvel New Media (also called Marvel Digital) is a unit of Marvel Entertainment consisting of the company's website, web series, and podcast. Digital shows under New Media are THWIP! The Big Marvel Show, The Marvel Minute, Marvel LIVE! and Marvel Top 10.

In October 2017, Ron Richards began working at Marvel Entertainment as vice president and Managing Editor of New Media, while Marvel Digital freelance on-air host Lorraine Cink was hired as Senior Creative Producer. Marvel New Media expanded into a new field with the development of a scripted podcast series, Wolverine: The Long Night, announced on December 5, 2017.

On April 7, 2018 at the Chicago Comic and Entertainment Expo, Marvel New Media announced its new slate. Marvel named Shane Rahmani as senior vice president and general manager of new media in March 2019. On April 10, 2019, a slate of 10 unscripted series including two from Marvel New Media was revealed for Disney+. After Rahmani left for Google, podcast host Ryan Penagos became vice president and creative executive for the organization.

Marvel and SiriusXM announced on October 22, 2019, a multi-year deal for multiple scripted and unscripted podcast series for 2020 debuts. The first four scripted series feature Black Widow, Hawkeye, Star-Lord, and Wolverine, which is planned to lead to a fifth series featuring all four characters. The slate's unscripted podcasts would consist of talk shows, Marvel's history via a modern-day pop cultural view, and popular Marvel franchises-focused podcasts.

Webcasts 
Earth's Mightiest Show (March 2018–) A weekly variety web series focusing on fandom and Marvel culture
Eat the Universe
Marvel LIVE!
The Marvel Minute
Marvel Top 10 (2017–)
Marvel's Hero Project  (November 12, 2019 – March 20, 2020) produced with Maggievision Productions for Disney+; documents youngsters affecting their local communities
Marvel's 616 working title (TBA) produced with Supper Club for Disney+; anthology documentary series features the intersection between Marvel's stories, characters, and creators and the real world
Marvel's Storyboards (TBA) for Disney+; is hosted by Joe Quesada, creative director of Marvel Entertainment, where he interviews guests from various backgrounds to get to know their story with an expected around a dozen 10 to 15 minutes long episodes.
This Week in Marvel (relaunch)
THWIP! The Big Marvel Show
Women of Marvel  (June 2014–?; relaunched February 2018–) a female point of view of the comic industry

Podcasts

Interview/unscripted

Drama

Former

 Marvel Toys, formerly "Toy Biz" (1984–2007)
 Marvel Merchandising department/Heroes World Distribution Co. (early 1970s–1975/1994–1996)
 Malibu Comics (1994–1997)
 Marvel Books division (c.1985)
 Marvel Comics Ltd. (1972–1995; UK subsidiary)
 Marvel Studios, LLC (1996–2015) formerly Marvel Films (1993–1996), a film and television production company; now a subsidiary of The Walt Disney Studios
 Marvel Films Animation – animation subdivision (1994–1997)
 Marvel Film Productions LLC (Delaware)
 MVL Development LLC (Delaware) rights subsidiary
 Marvel Television, Inc. (2010–2019) now a division of Marvel Studios.
 Marvel Animation, LLC. (2008–2020) Subsidiary charged with oversight of Marvel's animation productions.
 MLG Productions (2006–2011), Marvel & Lionsgate's subsidiary group for Marvel Animated Features
 Marvel Animation Studios (2012–2020)
Marvel Mania Restaurant (Marvel Restaurant Venture Corp.)
 Marvel Enterprise division
 Marvel Interactive
 Online Entertainment (Marvel Zone)
 Software Publishing
Fleer Corporation
Panini Group: Italian sticker manufacturer
SkyBox International
Marvel Music Groups (1981–1989) music publishing subsidiary
Marvel Productions (1981–1989)
Mighty Marvel Music Corporation (1981–1989) music publishing subsidiary
 Spider-Man Merchandising, L.P. (2001–2013) A joint venture of Marvel and Sony Pictures Consumer Products Inc. that owned the rights to Spider-Man movie related licensed products.
 Welsh Publishing Group: children magazine publisher

Executives

Chairmen
 Ronald O. Perelman (January 6, 1989 – October 23, 1996)
 Scott M. Sassa (October 23, 1996 – June 20, 1997)
 Morton E. Handel (October 1, 1998 – December 31, 2009)
 Isaac Perlmutter (April 1993 – March 1995; January 1, 2017 – present)

Vice Chairmen
 Terry Stewart (March 1995 – December 1995)
 Isaac Perlmutter (November 30, 2001 – December 31, 2009)
 Peter Cuneo (June 17, 2003 – December 31, 2009)

CEOs
 William C. Bevins (1991 – October 23, 1996)
 Scott M. Sassa (October 23, 1996 – June 20, 1997)
 Joseph Calamari (June 23, 1997 – October 1, 1998)
 Joseph Ahearn (October 1, 1998 – November 25, 1998)
 Eric Ellenbogen (November 25, 1998 – July 20, 1999)
 F. Peter Cuneo (July 20, 1999 – December 31, 2002)
 Allen S. Lipson (January 1, 2003 – December 31, 2004)
 Office of the Chief Executive
 Isaac Perlmutter (January 1, 2005 – December 31, 2016)
 Executive Vice Presidents:
 Alan Fine (April 2009 – ? )
 John Turitzin (September 2006 – ?)
 David Maisel (September 2006 – December 31, 2009)

Presidents
 Stan Lee (1972–1973)
 Al Landau (1973–1975)
 Jim Galton (1975–1991)
 Terry Stewart (1992–1993
 Rick Ungar (? – November 1993)
 Avi Arad (November 1993 – ?)
 Bruce Stein (? – November 1994)
 William Bevins Jr. (November 1994 – ?)
 Terry Stewart (May 1995)
 Jerry Calabrese (May 1995 – mid 1996; October 1998 – November 1998)
 Scott C. Marden (interim) (Mid 1996 – September 1996)
 David Schreff (September 1996 – ?)
 Joseph Calamari (? – October 1998)
 Eric Ellenbogen (November 1998 – July 1999)
 F. Peter Cuneo (July 1999 – January 1, 2003)
 Allen Lipson (January 1, 2003 – January 1, 2005)
 Alan Fine (2009–2015) also, chair of Marvel's Creative Committee
 Dan Buckley (January 2017 – present)

Others

 Bill Jemas, President of Publishing and Consumer Products (February 2000 – October 2010)
 Bruno Maglione, President of Marvel International, November 2003
 Joe Quesada, Chief Creative Officer (2010–2019), Creative Director (2019–2022)
 Kevin Feige, Chief Creative Officer, Marvel (2019–present)
 Bill Jemas, Chief Operating Officer (January 2002 – October 2010), Chief Marketing Officer (October 2010 – late 2013)
 Guy Karyo, Executive Vice President of Operations and Chief Information Officer (October 2010)
 Jeph Loeb, EVP and Head of Marvel Television (2010-2019)

Productions

Television

Live-action

Animated

Short series

Film

Live-action

Animated 
All the films are made for Direct-to-video/television and produced by Marvel Animation, except as indicated.

Short films

See also 

 Marvel Studios
 Marvel Cinematic Universe
 Sony's Spider-Man Universe
 Marvel Games
 Lists of Marvel Comics characters
 Marvel characters in other media
 List of unproduced Marvel Comics adaptations

Notes

References

External links
 

 
American companies established in 1998
Entertainment companies based in New York City
Mass media companies based in New York City
Entertainment companies established in 1998
Mass media companies established in 1998
Companies formerly listed on the New York Stock Exchange
Disney acquisitions
The Walt Disney Company subsidiaries
2009 mergers and acquisitions